Jonathan Michael Samet (born 1946 in Newport News, Virginia) is an American pulmonary physician and epidemiologist who serves as dean of the Colorado School of Public Health. He is also the chair of the Clean Air Scientific Advisory Committee of the Environmental Protection Agency, as well as the Tobacco Products Scientific Advisory Committee of the Food and Drug Administration.

Education
Samet received his A.B. from Harvard College in 1966, his M.D. from the University of Rochester School of Medicine in 1970, and his M.S. in epidemiology from the Harvard School of Public Health in 1977.

Career
In 1978, Samet joined the faculty of the University of New Mexico as an assistant professor, where he became an associate professor in 1982. In 1986, he became the Professor of Family, Community, and Emergency Medicine at the University of New Mexico's School of Medicine, as well as the chief of the Pulmonary Division there. From 1994 until 2008, he was a professor at Johns Hopkins University's Bloomberg School of Public Health, as well as the Chair of the Department of Epidemiology there. He also served as the director of Johns Hopkins' Institute for Global Tobacco Control from 1998 to 2008. In 2008, he joined the faculty of the University of Southern California as the Flora L. Thornton Chair of the Department of Preventive Medicine, as well as the founding director of the USC Institute for Global Health. In 2011, he served as the chair of an International Agency for Research on Cancer working group regarding whether mobile phone use was carcinogenic. In 2017 he became dean of the Colorado School of Public Health.

Research
Samet's research focuses on the health risks of pollutants such as air pollution, radon, and passive smoking.

Honors and awards
Samet received the Surgeon General's Medallion in 1990 and 2006, the 2004 Prince Mahidol Award for Global Health awarded by the King of Thailand, and the 2006 Public Service Award of the American Thoracic Society. In 1997, he was inducted into the Institute of Medicine.

References

1946 births
Living people
People from Newport News, Virginia
University of Southern California faculty
American pulmonologists
American epidemiologists
Members of the National Academy of Medicine
University of Rochester alumni
Harvard School of Public Health alumni
Tobacco researchers